Simone Borchardt (born 11 September 1967) is a German politician of the Christian Democratic Union (CDU) who has been serving as member of the Bundestag since 2021.

References 

1967 births
Living people
Members of the Bundestag for Saxony-Anhalt
Members of the Bundestag 2021–2025
Members of the Bundestag for the Christian Democratic Union of Germany
Members of the Bundestag for Mecklenburg-Western Pomerania
21st-century German politicians
21st-century German women politicians